Qader Magsi is a Pakistani politician from the Sindh Taraqi Pasand Party.

Qader Magsi was born on 25 December 1962 in Thatta. He received primary and intermediate education in Thatta. Later he joined Liaquat Medical College LMC (now Liaquat University of Medical and Health Sciences Jamshoro L.U.M.H.S) in 1981 for MBBS. In 1982, he became member of Jeay Sindh Students' Federation (JSSF) in LMC unit.

Magsi later established Taraqi Pasand Wing. He has been imprisoned various times on mass murder and genocide charges. Magsi converted his Tarqi Pasand Wing into The Sindh Taraqi Pasand Party (STP) on March 21, 1991, he then became the founding chairman of the party.

After the defeat in the 2013 Pakistani general election, seven senior leaders announced their resignation en block from the Sindh Taraqi Pasand Party and blamed that Qadir Magsi flawed policies that led to the party's defeat.

Qadir Magsi is widely held responsible for the ethnically motivated murder of more than 1000 Muhajir people in the 1988 Hyderabad massacre. However, he was acquitted of all charges in 2003.

Magsi for united Pakistan 

On March 24, 2015, while addressing 24th annual motherland day public meeting in Qasimabad Town, Hyderabad, STTP Chief Dr Magsi urged the Sindhi nationalists to give up demand for secession from Pakistan. He further said: "The breakup of Pakistan will immediately lead to the division of Sindh into many parts. The terrorists employed for this agenda of foreign powers are working on this scheme in Sindh".

Support for Zarb-e-Azb 

Magsi has expressed his unwavering support for the ongoing military operation Zarb-e-Azb
by Pakistani Army in North Waziristan against the banned terrorist outfits. He demanded a full-scale operation until there were no more terrorists left all over the country.

Magsi and MQM
Qadir has criticized MQM on many occasions. He has accused MQM for propaganda of new province on the agenda of international agents  and suggested MQM to shun ethnicity politics.

References

Bibliography
 Book Aakhir Kyoo (Written by Dr Shagufta Faraz)

External links 
 Dr Qadir Magsi

Pakistani politicians
Baloch people
Living people
1962 births
People from Thatta District